Maurice E. Rawlings (August 17, 1906 – September 10, 1982) was a justice of the Iowa Supreme Court from July 19, 1965, to August 17, 1978, appointed from Woodbury County, Iowa.

References

Justices of the Iowa Supreme Court
1906 births
1982 deaths
20th-century American judges